Aeranthes albidiflora is a species of orchid native to Madagascar. It may be extinct due to illegal collection and logging.

References

albidiflora
Orchids of Madagascar
Critically endangered flora of Africa
Species endangered by the pet trade
Species endangered by logging
Plants described in 1960